A new biometric Libyan passport was revealed in February 2013. The cover of the new passport depicts a star and crescent as its central feature, as found in the flag of Libya. Thus, the symbol can be considered a de facto emblem for Libya.

The Government of National Unity, established in March 2021 has adopted an official seal incorporating a crescent moon and star and the name of the state and government in Arabic.

History

Pre-independence

Kingdom of Libya (1951–1969)

The coat of arms of the Kingdom of Libya was used from 1952–1969.
A royal decree from 1952 described the coat of arms of the United Kingdom of Libya as follows:

The emblem of the United Kingdom of Libya would be
a silver crescent and star, resting on a background of black surrounded by a green frame; all crested with a small golden crown, standing on a black base; all in the centre of a red mantle and surrounded by 9 (nine) golden stars, the mantle decorated with golden ornaments; all crested with a crown of a golden diadem with five hoops set with stars and bearing the crescent and star.

Libya under Gaddafi (1969–2011)
In 1970, Libya adopted as its coat of arms the Eagle of Saladin, which had become a symbol of Arab nationalism following its prominence in the Egyptian revolution of 1952, after which it was used in the coat of arms of Egypt, the United Arab Republic, Yemen, Iraq, and Palestine. In 1972, Libya's participation in the Federation of Arab Republics led both it and Egypt to abandon the Eagle of Saladin, and to adopt as their coats of arms the Hawk of Quraish, the emblem of the tribe of Muhammad used by Syria, which became the coat of arms of the Federation. On Libya's exit from the Federation in 1977 followed by its adaption of Gaddafi's system of Jamahiriya, the Hawk of the Quraish was retained, but modified to reflect the new all green flag that Libya also adopted at that time. The hawk was also changed to face in the other direction. The phrase  (ittiħād al-jumhūriyyāt al-`arabiyya "Federation (literally Union) of Arab Republics") still remained written on the banner clutched in the feet of the hawk.

Libya under the National Transitional Council (2011–2012)
The National Transitional Council, supported as the legitimate administration by the United Nations since September 2011, used a seal that depicts a crescent moon and star, represented in the colors of the Libyan flag (red, black, and green), with the names of the council  (al-majlis al-waṭanī al-intiqālī, "The Transitional National Council") and of the state  (Lībiyā, Libya) displayed in Arabic and English.

The interim Prime Minister's office and departments of the interim government used a different seal. The main charge of this emblem is an outline map of Libya in the design of the Libyan flag.

Libya under the General National Congress (2012–2014)
The General National Congress which served as the legislature of Libya between 2012 and 2014 had adopted which depicted a crescent moon and star surrounded by the name of the congress written in Arabic and English. It was used to certify documents issued and laws passed by the congress.

An emblem was also adopted for governmental purposes and formed the basis of the seals used by the Prime Minister's office and the departments of the Libyan government. This emblem consisted of a crescent moon and star surrounded by olive branches similar to those found on the emblem of the United Nations.

Libya under the House of Representatives (2014–2016)
The House of Representatives elected in 2014 and currently based in Tobruk has adopted a seal for official use. This depicts a crescent moon, arches and the name House of Representatives in English and Arabic. The seals and emblems adopted for the Libyan Government during the term of the General National Congress, remained in use during this period.

Libya under the Government of National Accord (2016–2021)
The Government of National Accord was formed as a result of the Libyan Political Agreement signed in December 2015 and has been endorsed by the United Nations Security Council as the sole legitimate government of Libya. The Government of National Accord uses a seal depicting its name and the name of the state in Arabic and English surrounding a crescent moon and star.

Symbols of the rival Tobruk-based Government (2016–2021)
A rival Tobruk-based Government was formed in Tobruk under actual guidance of the Field Marshal Khalifa Haftar, and used an emblem depicting the Hawk of Quraish and a shield.

Libya under the Government of National Unity (2021-present)
A Government of National Unity was formed in March 2021 following on from meetings of the Libyan Political Dialogue Forum. The unity government has adopted an official seal incorporating a crescent moon and star and surrounded by the words  "Government of National Unity - State of Libya". The seal was designed by Adly al-Akkari.

See also

 Flag of Libya
 National Anthem of Libya

Notes

References

National symbols of Libya
Libya
Libya